Gyzyloba or Karmiravan is a village in the Tartar District of Azerbaijan, in the disputed region of Nagorno-Karabakh. The village is on the ceasefire line between the armed forces of the breakaway Republic of Artsakh and those of Azerbaijan. There have been allegations of ceasefire violations in the village's vicinity. The village had an ethnic Armenian-majority population in 1989.

History 
During the Soviet period, the village was a part of the Mardakert District of the Nagorno-Karabakh Autonomous Oblast.

References

External links 
 

Populated places in Tartar District
Nagorno-Karabakh